Minam can refer to:

Minam Station, a station of Busan Metro Line 3 in Busan
Minam, Oregon, a community in the U.S. state of Oregon
Minam River in the U.S. state of Oregon
Kkonminam or Kkot-minam